Jason and Medea in  the Argonautica of Apollonius of Rhodes
Jason and Medea painting (1907)
Jason et Médée (ballet) (1763)

See also
Argonautica
Golden Fleece
Perseus and Andromeda
Saint George and the Dragon
Medea (disambiguation)